Nepogomphoides stuhlmanni is a species of dragonfly in the family Gomphidae. It is found in Malawi, Mozambique, and Tanzania. Its natural habitats are subtropical or tropical moist lowland forests and rivers. It is threatened by habitat loss.

References

Gomphidae
Insects described in 1899
Taxonomy articles created by Polbot